Body Jumper (or Pop Weed Sayong) is a 2001 Thai horror/comedy film directed by Haeman Chatemee and written by Pakphum Wonjinda.

Plot
In 1932 Siam, a ravenous female ghost named Pop is ravaging the village of Sam Kotr, Roi Et, killing all the men. An exorcist is brought in, and he wraps the ghost in magical rope, which should bind her forever, or so it is thought.

Flash forward to 2000, it is the start of a new school term, and a group of university students have arrived from Bangkok to take part in a rural development project in Sam Kotr. Some of the boys spy on their beautiful female classmate, Ker, while she is bathing in the river. Accidentally, they break open a sealed well and unknowingly release the ancient ghost Pop. The ghost possesses Ker, and when the students return to the capital, the spirit is with them.

Inhabiting Ker, the ghost becomes hungry again, turning Ker into a nymphomaniac. She cannot get enough men. Ker invites one classmate out for a date. Making out in the car after a movie, she transforms into the demon ghost and runs her hand into the man's body. He survives, but it is later revealed that his liver is gone.

Ker's friends notice a change in her behavior, especially after she uses her long tongue to clean a plate of liver, and she transforms into the scary demon.

Eventually a mysterious man named Kong appears and shows the students how to dispatch the ghost by using condoms. But the spirit simply takes possession of other bodies, jumping from body to body in order to escape and survive. Kong then equips the students with a special camera and other weapons needed to combat the ghost.

Cast
 Danai Smuthkochorn as Com
 Angela Grant as Fah
 Chompunuch Piyapanee as Ker
 Chatewut Watcharakhun as Isabella
 Chaicharn Nimpulsawasdi as Wu
 Napatsanun Thaweekitthavorn as Pim

External links
 
 

2001 films
2001 horror films
2001 comedy horror films
Thai ghost films
Sahamongkol Film International films
Thai teen films
Thai-language films
Thai comedy horror films
2000s teen horror films
2000s teen films
2001 directorial debut films
2001 comedy films
Thai supernatural horror films